Frank Milo McBryde is an American politician and optician who served as the Mayor of Fayetteville, North Carolina from 2000 until 2001. McBryde became Mayor following the death of his predecessor, seven-term Mayor J.L. Dawkins, who died in office on May 30, 2000.

McBryde is the third generation of his family to be involved in Fayetteville city government. His father, Frank McBryde (1912-1990), was a community leader who served as an alderman from 1945 to 1949. McBryde graduated from Methodist University in 1968.

References

Year of birth missing (living people)
Mayors of Fayetteville, North Carolina
North Carolina city council members
American opticians
Methodist University alumni
Living people